The King of Paris is a 1930 French-German film directed by Leo Mittler and starring Iván Petrovich, Marie Glory and Pierre Batcheff. It is the French-language version of the German film The King of Paris, part of a trend of making multi-language versions during the early years of sound.

Cast
 Iván Petrovich
 Marie Glory
 Pierre Batcheff
 Suzanne Bianchetti
 Gabriel Gabrio as Rascol
 Pierre Juvenet
 Marthe Sarbel

See also
 The King of Paris (1923 film)

References

Bibliography

External links 
 

1930 films
1930 comedy films
French comedy films
German comedy films
1930s French-language films
Films based on French novels
Films based on works by Georges Ohnet
Films directed by Leo Mittler
French multilingual films
German multilingual films
German black-and-white films
Remakes of French films
Sound film remakes of silent films
1930 multilingual films
Films scored by Walter Goehr
1930s German films
1930s French films